The following is a list of massacres that have occurred in Hungary (numbers may be approximate):

References 

Hungary

Massacres
Massacres